Sam McIntyre (born 20 March 1998) is an Australian professional rugby league footballer who plays as a er for the Gold Coast Titans in the NRL.

He previously played for the Wests Tigers in the National Rugby League.

Background
A Port Macquarie Sharks junior, McIntyre made his NRL Under-20s debut for the Newcastle Knights in March 2017. His "impressive first-up performance" saw him make 26 tackles and run for over 150 metres. Described as "A long-striding forward capable of breaking the line", he was "poached" by the Wests Tigers, joining them on a development contract for the 2018 season. He joined their full-time squad in 2019, playing 21 games for the feeder club the Western Suburbs Magpies, scoring 3 tries, making 600 tackles, and running for near 2000 metres.

Playing career
McIntyre was named to make his debut on 20 June 2020. Coach Michael Maguire said, "Fans can expect to see someone who is tough, runs hard and does all the simple things really well. He’s a hard worker and that’s his character. He’ll get out there and do what he needs to for his teammates, he’s very selfless." With injuries to teammates Zane Musgrove and Alex Twal, McIntyre played a larger than expected 46 minutes, making 32 tackles, and running for 126 metres.

Remaining in the team for most of the rest of the year, McIntyre made 12 appearances, two in the starting team. He scored his first NRL try in round 10 in a record 48-0 "thrashing" of the Brisbane Broncos, and another in round 12. In November 2020, McIntyre signed a two-year deal with the Gold Coast Titans. McIntyre played a total of 13 games for the Gold Coast in the 2022 NRL season as the club finished 13th on the table.

References

External links
NRL profile

1998 births
Australian rugby league players
Wests Tigers players
Gold Coast Titans players
Western Suburbs Magpies NSW Cup players
Living people
Rugby league players from Canberra
Rugby league locks
Rugby league second-rows
Rugby league props